Hong Hyun-seok (born 16 June 1999) is a South Korean professional footballer who plays as a midfielder for Jupiler Pro League club Gent.

Club career
In January 2018, Hong moved from the youth team of Ulsan Hyundai to SpVgg Unterhaching. He made his professional debut for Unterhaching in the 3. Liga on 27 February 2019, coming on as a substitute for Lucas Hufnagel in the 84th minute against VfR Aalen, with the match finishing as a 1–4 away loss.

After a loan spell at FC Juniors OÖ, Hong played one season in the Austrian Bundesliga for LASK Linz before moving to KAA Gent in the Belgian Pro League in August 2022 in the aftermath of an ACL injury suffered by Buffalos striker Tarik Tissoudali, becoming the first Korean to play for the club.

On moving to Belgium, Hong was brought into the Gent first team immediately, scoring a spectacular overhead kick goal 28 minutes into his debut away to KV Oostende on 12 August 2022, which Gent won 3–1.

International career
Hong was included in South Korea's squad for the boys' football tournament at the 2014 Summer Youth Olympics in Nanjing, China. He started in all four matches, with South Korea reaching the gold medal match before losing 1–2 to Peru, therefore earning a silver medal as runners-up.

In 2016, Hong made five appearances for the South Korea under-17 team.

References

External links
 
 
 FC Juniors OÖ profile

1999 births
Living people
South Korean footballers
South Korea under-17 international footballers
South Korean expatriate footballers
Association football midfielders
Ulsan Hyundai FC players
SpVgg Unterhaching players
FC Juniors OÖ players
LASK players
K.A.A. Gent players
3. Liga players
2. Liga (Austria) players
Austrian Football Bundesliga players
Belgian Pro League players
Footballers at the 2014 Summer Youth Olympics
South Korean expatriate sportspeople in Germany
South Korean expatriate sportspeople in Austria
South Korean expatriate sportspeople in Belgium
Expatriate footballers in Germany
Expatriate footballers in Austria
Expatriate footballers in Belgium